The Heladhanavi Power Station was a  thermal power station in Puttalam, Sri Lanka. It was decommissioned in 2015 by request from the Ministry of Power and Energy. The power station consisted of six  generation units of  each.

See also 
 List of power stations in Sri Lanka

References

External links 
 
 
 
 
 
 

Oil-fired power stations in Sri Lanka
Buildings and structures in Puttalam District
Former power stations in Sri Lanka